Live with Regis and Kelly was the 2001–2011 title of a long-running American syndicated morning talk show. Regis Philbin and Kelly Ripa were the hosts in that period.

Season 14 (2001–2002)

September 2001

Season 15 (2002–2003)

Season 16 (2003–2004)

Season 17 (2004–2005)

September 2004

October 2004

November 2004

December 2004

January 2005

February 2005

March 2005

Season 18 (2005–2006)

September 2005

October 2005

November 2005

December 2005

January 2006

February 2006

March 2006

April 2006

May 2006

June 2006

July 2006

August 2006

Season 19 (2006–2007)

September 2006

October 2006

November 2006

December 2006

January 2007

February 2007

March 2007

April 2007

May 2007

June 2007

July 2007

August 2007

Season 20 (2007–2008)

September 2007

October 2007

November 2007

December 2007

January 2008

February 2008

March 2008

April 2008

May 2008

June 2008

July 2008

August 2008

Season 21 (2008–2009)

September 2008

October 2008

November 2008

December 2008

January 2009

February 2009

March 2009

April 2009

May 2009

June 2009

July 2009

August 2009

Season 22 (2009–2010)

September 2009

October 2009

November 2009

December 2009

January 2010

February 2010

March 2010

April 2010

May 2010

June 2010

July 2010

August 2010

Season 23 (2010–2011)

September 2010

October 2010

November 2010

December 2010

January 2011

February 2011

March 2011

April 2011

May 2011

June 2011

July 2011

August 2011

Season 24 (2011)

September 2011

October 2011

November 2011

References

Lists of American non-fiction television series episodes